Micaela Patrícia Reis (born December 21, 1988) is an Angolan actress, TV Host, model and beauty queen who was a Top 10 finalist at Miss Universe 2007 and placed first runner-up to Miss World 2007, becoming Miss World Africa. She was the highest placed Miss Angola at both Miss Universe and Miss World before the win of Leila Lopes in Miss Universe 2011.

Early life
Reis was born on December 21, 1988 in Luanda Province, Angola. Reis' Portuguese father died before her birth, so she was raised by her Angolan mother and her older siblings. She won the 2007 Miss Angola contest in December 2006 representing Angolans in Portugal.

Pageantry

Miss Universe 2007
Reis made it into the Top 10 at the 2007 Miss Universe pageant held in Mexico City, Mexico on 28 May 2007. She placed 5th in swimsuit with a score of 9.150 and then 7th in evening gown with a score of 8.363. She finished 7th overall.

Miss World 2007
After Miss Universe, Reis went on to compete at the 2007 Miss World pageant, which was held on December 1 in Sanya, China where she finished as first runner-up to eventual winner, Zhang Zilin of China. Reis was also named Miss World Africa at the end of the event.
This is the highest placement for Angola in Miss World.

Life after Miss Angola
After competing in Miss World, Micaela posed for FHM Portugal covering their June issue and was also a judge in the Miss Universe Tanzania 2008 competition.

Filmography 
Reis starred in the Angolan soap opera television series "Windeck" an international success and a thrilling story, staged in Luanda, which revealed the actions of those who do not care about the means they have to use to reach their ends. She played the role Victória Kajibanga the desperate sister who could sell her sister if it will give her what she desires in life.

Reis' first TV series was Voo Directo. A co production between Angola and Portugal, it told the story of four flight attendants. Micaela played the part of Yara, a sweet girl, who falls in love with a man online.

References 
 Miss Angola/2007 Among World’s 10 Most Beautiful Women AngolaPress, 29 May 2007
 https://web.archive.org/web/20151007031929/http://www.angolamonitor.co.ao/en/buzz/1241-do-you-remember-how-much-ambition-costs.html

External links
 Official Miss Angola website

Living people
Angolan people of Portuguese descent
Miss Angola winners
Miss Universe 2007 contestants
Miss World 2007 delegates
People from Luanda
1988 births